Five Days at Memorial is an American disaster medical drama television miniseries based on the 2013 book of the same name by Sheri Fink. It was developed, written and directed by John Ridley and Carlton Cuse.

The miniseries premiered on August 12, 2022, on Apple TV+.

Premise
Depicts the difficulties a New Orleans hospital endures after Hurricane Katrina makes landfall on the city.

Cast and characters

Main
 Vera Farmiga as Dr. Anna Pou
 Cherry Jones as Susan Mulderick
 Cornelius Smith Jr. as Dr. Bryant King
 Robert Pine as Dr. Horace Baltz
 Adepero Oduye as Karen Wynn
 Julie Ann Emery as Diane Robichaux
 Michael Gaston as Arthur "Butch" Schafer
 Molly Hager as Virginia Rider

Recurring

 W. Earl Brown as Ewing Cook
 Stephen Bogaert as René Goux
 Darrin Baker as Dr. Martin Bisley
 Ted Atherton as Richard Deichmann
 Tammy Isbell as  Gina Isbell
 Katie Boland as Kristy Johnson
 Deborah Hay as Therese Mendez
 Sarah Allen as Lori Budo
 Sharron Matthews as Cheri Landry
 Jessica Greco as Sandra Cordray
 Joel Keller as Eric Yancovich

 Jonathan Cake as Vince Pou
 Jeffrey Nordling as Richard T. Simmons, Jr.
 Damon Standifer as Emmett Everett
 Lanette Ware as Carrie Everett
 J. D. Evermore as Mark LeBlanc
 Monica Wyche as Sandra LeBlanc
 Dawn Greenhalgh as Elvira 'Vera' LeBlanc
 Joy Tanner as Jill
 Raven Dauda as Angela McManus
 Diane Johnstone as Wilda McManus
 Beth Malone as Linda Schafer

 Joe Carroll as Michael Arvin
 Paulino Nunes as Steven Jones
 Alexandra Castillo as Marcia Tellez
 Jeremiah Oh as Ken Nakamaru
 Ryan Allen as Drew Charles
 Tre Smith as Troye
 Jessica B. Hill as Kathleen Fournier
 Ma-Anne Dionisio as Jane DiMaapi
 Malube Uhindu-Gingala as Tarika Hill
 Nola Augustson as Minnie Cook
 Lorna Wilson as Mrs. Mulderick

Guest
 John Diehl as Frank Minyard
 Tom Irwin as  Walker Shaw
 Ervin Ross as Rodney Scott
 Natasha Mumba as Tiana Colburn
 Philip Craig as Attorney General Charles Foti, Jr.
 Ean Castellanos as Michael Morales

Episodes

Production

Development
In 2013, shortly after its release, Scott Rudin acquired the rights to adapt Five Days at Memorial: Life and Death in a Storm-Ravaged Hospital as a film to be produced with Eli Bush under Scott Rudin Productions.

By 2017, the film rights had reportedly lapsed, prompting Ryan Murphy to approach Scott Rudin about adapting Five Days at Memorial for television as the third season of the FX true crime anthology series American Crime Story, with Sarah Paulson set to star as Dr. Anna Pou. The adaptation, however, never came to fruition, and in 2019, Rudin started shopping the project elsewhere.

As part of his overall deal with ABC Signature, Carlton Cuse acquired the television rights, and then contacted John Ridley to collaborate. In September 2020, Apple ordered Five Days at Memorial as a limited series to be produced for Apple TV+. Both Cuse and Ridley serve as writers, directors, executive producers, and co-showrunners of the series.

Casting
Vera Farmiga was cast in March 2021, with Adepero Oduye, Cornelius Smith Jr. and Julie Ann Emery joining in April 2021, Cherry Jones and Molly Hager joining in May 2021, Michael Gaston joining in June 2021, and Joe Carroll joining in August 2021.

Filming
Production took place from May 25 to November 10, 2021, in Toronto and New Orleans.

Release
The series premiered on Apple TV+ on August 12, 2022, with its first three episodes. Each following episode was released weekly on Fridays.

Reception
The review aggregator website Rotten Tomatoes reports an 90% approval rating with an average rating of 7.8/10, based on 29 critic reviews. The website's critics consensus reads, "Five Days at Memorial is unflinching to the point of punishing, thoroughly recounting an absolute calamity while giving due to those who tried their best to stanch the tragic fallout." Metacritic, which uses a weighted average, assigned a score of 74 out of 100 based on 18 critics, indicating "generally favorable reviews".

Accolades 
The show won for  Outstanding Supporting Visual Effects in a Photoreal Episode at the 21st Visual Effects Society Awards.

References

External links
 
 

2020s American medical television series
2020s American drama television series
2020s American drama television miniseries
2022 American television series debuts
Apple TV+ original programming
English-language television shows
Television series about Hurricane Katrina
Television series by ABC Signature Studios
Television series created by Carlton Cuse
Television series created by John Ridley
Television shows filmed in Toronto
Television shows based on non-fiction books
Television shows filmed in New Orleans
Television shows set in New Orleans